Election Day is a 2007 Russian comedy film directed by Oleg Fomin.

Synopsis
The staff of a successful Moscow radio station are sent into the Volga region to assist in the promotion of a candidate for the local governor elections. They are assisted by the local theatre director, a fake priest, and their boss' connections.

Cast 
 Kvartet I:
 Kamil Larin as Kamil
  as Slava
 Aleksandr Demidov as Sasha
 Leonid Barats  as Alex
 Yevgeny Steblov as Director
 Mikhail Yefremov as Father Innokenty
 Nonna Grishayeva as Nonna
 Vasily Utkin as Igor Vladimirovich Tsaplin, candidate for Governor
  Andrey Makarevich as cameo
 Sergey Shnurov as cameo
 Marianna Maksimovskaya as cameo
 Bi-2 as cameo
 Uma2rman as cameo
 Valery Barinov as Ivan Burdun
 Alexander Gurevich as candidate Alinkin
 Georgy Martirosyan as singer

Reception

Box office
Election Day has grossed US$6 149 746.

Critical response
Film.ru reviewer Valery Kichin called Oleg Fomin's film a really funny and really relevant comedy.

As noted by political consultant Igor Mintusov, it was filmed very talentedly and very well, there are many moments well captured in form. Although the reality is quite adequately shown there, there are few strategic ideas to be seen there.

Sequel
  (2016)

References

External links 

2007 comedy films
2007 films
Russian comedy films
2000s Russian-language films
Russian political satire films
Films about elections
Russian road movies